The 2005 Women's British Open was held 28–31 July at Royal Birkdale Golf Club in Southport, England. It was the 29th edition of the Women's British Open, and the fifth as a major championship on the LPGA Tour.

Jeong Jang led wire-to-wire and won her first LPGA event and only major title, four strokes ahead of runner-up Sophie Gustafson. Michelle Wie, age 15, tied for third and was the low amateur in her final major before turning professional in the fall.

Past champions in the field

Made the cut

Missed the cut

Course layout

Source:

Round summaries

First round
Thursday, 28 July 2005

Second round
Friday, 29 July 2005

Amateurs: Stahle (−6), Wie (−2), Ciganda (+1), Queen (+16).

Third round
Saturday, 30 July 2005

Final round
Sunday, 31 July 2005

(a) denotes amateur

Amateurs: Wie (−10), Stahle (−8), Ciganda (+2)

Source:

References

External links
Ladies European Tour: 2005 Weetabix  Women's British Open results
LPGA: 2005 Women's British Open results

Women's British Open
Golf tournaments in England
Sport in Southport
British Open
Women's British Open
Women's British Open
2000s in Merseyside